The Olympus M.Zuiko Digital ED 12mm f/2 is a Micro Four Thirds System Prime lens by Olympus Corporation.  In the Micro Four Thirds format, it is a wide- or ultra-wide lens.

The lens is focus-by-wire, using the autofocus motor even for manual focus.  The motor is quiet, suitable for  video use ("MSC"- movie and stills compatible).  Unlike other focus-by-wire systems, the lens offers two manual focus modes. In the traditional focus-by-wire mode, the focus mechanism operates the same way as other Micro Four Thirds lenses. The focus ring can be moved to engage a "snap focus" mode, which displays a distance scale for zone focusing, and provides a feel similar to mechanical focus systems. The "snap focus" mode makes this the first auto-focus capable Micro Four Thirds lens with a distance scale. The front element does not rotate, allowing the consistent use of polarized filters; a 46mm filter thread lets users share filters with many of Panasonic's lenses.

Early reviews are positive, with good sharpness and build quality.

External links 

 Official press release
 Micro Four Thirds Lenses

References

12mm F2
Camera lenses introduced in 2011